Stibo DX (formerly known as CCI Europe) is an international software company that develops and delivers multichannel content and digital asset management systems to media and brand publishers. The company is known for its CUE platform, which allows companies to create and publish content online, on smartphones, on social media, in apps, in print, and more.

Stibo DX is headquartered in Aarhus, Denmark, and has offices in Norway, Germany, the US, and Bangladesh. The company has acquired two subsidiary companies: The online news CMS developer Escenic, in 2013, and the Hamburg-based digital asset management vendor Digital Collections in April 2019. Since January 2021, all three companies are unified under the company brand Stibo DX.

Stibo DX serves a wide selection of customers worldwide, including several larger news companies in the US, Europe, India, and Australia.

History
Stibo DX was founded by the Stibo Group in 1979 as "CCI Europe". By 1988, Stibo DX had evolved into a software company specialized in producing publishing solutions for the newspaper industry.

In 1991, the company released one of the world’s first IT-based tools for editorial page design: CCI Layout Champ. Since then, Stibo DX has developed a number of content management systems (CMS) for the news industry, such as CCI NewsDesk, CCI NewsGate, and CCI Digital Publishing Solution and CUE Publishing Platform.

In 2013 started to develop the content creation and publishing platform CUE for media companies, which was launched in 2016. In 2019, CUE was additionally introduced as a Digital Experience Platform for retailers and brand publishers and is today offered as CUE Content Hub.

References

External links
 Official website

Software companies of Denmark
Companies based in Aarhus
Danish companies established in 1979